Popeck (born Judka Herpstu; 18 May 1936) is a French actor and stand-up comedian.

The son of Jewish immigrants from Poland and Romania, Judka Herpstu was born in Paris. He was among the children saved from the Holocaust by the OSE, but his mother was murdered in Auschwitz. He studied acting at the Cours Simon and started his career on stage under the name Jean Herbert.

In 1968, Herpstu created the character of Popeck, a grumpy Eastern-European immigrant dressed in a 3-piece suit, wearing a bowler hat and speaking French with a strong Yiddish accent. Sketches featuring Popeck made Herpstu known to the larger public, and the actor identified with his character so far as to finally adopt the name Popeck for himself in 1978.

In addition to his work on stage, Popeck has acted in movies. He had a small role in Roman Polanski's The Pianist.

References

External links 
 

1936 births
Living people
French male comedians
French people of Polish-Jewish descent
French people of Romanian-Jewish descent
Male actors from Paris
French Holocaust survivors
20th-century French Jews